Nerds is an American candy launched in 1983 by the Sunmark Corporation under the brand name Willy Wonka Candy Company. Nerds are now made by the Ferrara Candy Company, a subsidiary of Ferrero Group. With their anthropomorphic covers, Nerds usually contain two flavors per box, and each flavor has a separate compartment and opening.

Production process 
The television show Unwrapped explains how Nerds are made. A factory worker states, "Basically we start off with a sugar crystal and we just keep coating it with more sugar." The factory spins huge barrel-like containers of sugar crystals, which receive coats of sugar until the Nerds are formed. Their original color is pure white; they receive their colors in separate barrels. The contents of the barrels are then transferred to boxes, which are divided into two compartments by a vertical partition so each half of the box contains a different flavor. Certain flavor combinations are frequently packaged together, such as grape and strawberry, the most popular pairing in the United States.

The nucleus of each candy is composed of one or more complete sucrose crystals. These optically clear monoclinic crystals are about 0.2–1 mm in length and help define the irregular shape. They are thickly glazed with carnauba wax, which gives them a hard bite and a gloss.

Nutritional facts 

The article "Nerds Candy Nutrition" states, "Nerds primarily consist of sugar. The top three ingredients are dextrose, sugar and malic acid. The rest of the candy contains less than 2 percent of corn syrup, artificial flavors, carnauba wax and artificial coloring. The artificial coloring varies by flavor." The allergy warnings of this candy state that Nerds are created "in a facility that also produces wheat and egg." The normal serving size is one tablespoon—about 15 grams. (One serving of Nerds is equivalent to 60 calories, mostly from carbohydrates, with little fat or protein.) The Halloween hand-out size is typically , and the larger boxes contain .

Early competition 
Nerds were a popular candy in the 1980s, but they had big competitors, including Pop Rocks, Candy Buttons, and Mike and Ike. Nerds also had a close cousin in the '80s—Dweebs. Dweebs were very similar to Nerds; but they were less sour and bigger in size. One of the most popular differences is that Dweebs contained three flavors instead of two, though the United Kingdom had a box of Nerds with three flavors for a limited time. According to Rob Bricken, "A squishier Nerd with more leg space and a surprise in the middle, Dweebs were more substantial, less sour, and displayed a greater depth and complexity than Nerds." Dweebs only lasted a very short time on the market, however.

Varieties
Nerds consist of various flavors and colors, ranging from extremely sweet to extremely sour; often, the two flavors in one box will contrast, and a single flavor may even exhibit both extremes. A Nerds breakfast cereal based on the concept appeared in the 1980s with two varieties (Orange and Cherry/Grape and Strawberry), but it had a short lifespan.

Flavors

Although many other flavors are available, some of the current regular flavors of Nerds include the following:
Strawberry and Grape (pink and purple)
Wild Cherry and Watermelon (orange or red and green)
Double Dipped Lemonade-Wild Cherry and Apple-Watermelon (red and yellow)
Sour- Lightning Lemon and Amped Apple (yellow and light green)
Surf 'n Turf- Totally Tropical Punch and Road Rash Raspberry (red and blue)
Wildberry and Peach (blue and orange)
Watermelon and Punch and Wildberry (green and blue)
Mango Chile and Guava (yellow and pink) El Mango Fuego
Lime and Pineapple (green and yellow)

Previous Flavors

 Orange and Cherry (Orange and Red)
 Watermelon and Punch and Grape and Punch (Green and White and Purple and White)
 Watermelon and Rainbow (Green and Mixed Colors)

Willy Wonka has also come up with several spin-off products of Nerds:

 Sour Nerds are big and they usually come in Lightning Lemon and Amped Apple. They are packaged in a regular box. A second flavor—Shocking Strawberry and Electric Blue—was also released.
 Strawberry Giant Chewy Nerds, also known as "Future Nerds", have a chewy jelly bean center with a bumpy, crunchy Nerd shell. They are the same product as Nerd Jelly Beans, but they are available year-round.
 Nerds Rope consists of gummy string with a variety of Nerds attached to the outside. It comes in original, berry and tropical flavors. 
 Rainbow Nerds is a box of regular Nerds with multiple flavors, with no partition or organization.
 Jumbo Nerds is a box of Nerds with multiple flavors—much larger than regular Nerds. The box depicts one jumbo Nerd on one end of a see-saw with several regular-sized Nerds trying to counter its weight.
 Nerds Gum Balls are bubble gum balls filled with multiple flavors of Nerds on the inside.
 Seasonal Nerds are sometimes manufactured for holidays. Flavors may include: 
Spooky Nerds, a Halloween variety featuring fruit punch (white) and orange flavors.
Frosty Nerds, a Christmas variety featuring watermelon (green), cherry (red) and fruit punch (white) flavors.
Valentine Nerds, a Valentine's Day variety in a miniature box featuring mixed strawberry (pink) and fruit punch (white) flavors. 
Hoppin' Nerds, an Easter variety featuring pink rainbow and blue rainbow flavors.
 Nerds Cereal, a now-discontinued breakfast cereal that, like the candy, featured two separate flavors in a box (Orange and Cherry/Grape and Strawberry). The cereal came with a mail-in offer for a Nerds cereal bowl, which also could be divided in two, like a standard Nerds box.
 Nerds Gum consisted of pieces that looked like regular Nerds, but were actually bubble gum. The box featured a Nerd floating away with a bubble gum bubble coming out of its mouth.
 Dweebs, now discontinued, were a soft, chewy version of Nerds. Released in the early 1990s, Dweebs contained three separate flavors rather than two. Dweebs were available only for a very short time, however.
Neon Nerds were introduced in 1996 and came in Pinktricity, LightningLime, and Electro Orange flavors. They are still sold in Australia and New Zealand. The LightningLime flavor was only sold in the UK, according to candy expert Jason Liebig.
Nerd Jelly Beans, produced for Easter, are jelly beans with a coating of carnauba wax, which makes them taste like Nerds.
Wonkalate, a UK-only chocolate bar, which, aside from its purple color, contained snozzberry-flavored Nerds.
Nerd Blizzard, a Nerd milkshake offered from Dairy Queen. Now discontinued, Nerds plus soft serve ice cream was not a popular match (this combination can still be found at DQs throughout Minnesota, however).
Candy Nerds Slushes, a variety of the Candy Slushes offered by Sonic that feature Nerds.
Nerds Gummy Clusters, bite-sized gummy balls coated in Nerds.

Throughout the 1980s, several new flavors of Nerds were introduced from time to time; for example, "Hot and Cool" Nerds (cinnamon and wintergreen flavored), blueberry and raspberry, banana, lemon and lime, and Cherry Cola.

Trivia 
According to Laurnie Wilson, "Some say that [Nerds were] named after a reference in the Dr. Seuss Book, If I Ran the Zoo, where a 'nerd' is mentioned as one of the creatures the narrator would collect for his zoo." Wilson also mentions the invention of the now-discontinued Nerds cereal. He points out, however, that "you can eat Nerds pretty much any other time of the day."

In 1985, Nerds were named ¨Candy Of The Year¨ by  the National Candy Wholesalers Association.

A variety of Nerds products have been sold exclusively in the United Kingdom. Jason Liebig claims that "back in 2005, Wonka’s UK arm released a product called Nerdalicious, which was sort of like Nerd-filled licorice."

External links 

 Official website

References

Products introduced in 1983
Nestlé brands
Candy
American confectionery
Ferrara Candy Company brands
The Willy Wonka Candy Company brands
Brand name confectionery